Love Sensuality Devotion: The Greatest Hits is a greatest hits album by the German musical project Enigma, released on 8 October 2001 by Virgin Records. The album, along with Love Sensuality Devotion: The Remix Collection brings a close to Michael Cretu's first chapter of Enigma. It contains most of Enigma's singles and songs from 1990 to 2001.

The album takes three songs from the first album, MCMXC a.D., four songs from The Cross of Changes, four songs from Le Roi est mort, vive le Roi!, five songs from The Screen Behind the Mirror, and also features a new single "Turn Around" and its intro "The Landing".

Track listing
"The Landing" (Michael Cretu) – 1:04
"Turn Around" (Cretu, Jens Gad) – 3:51
"Gravity of Love" (Cretu) – 3:59
"T.N.T. for the Brain" (Cretu) – 5:18
"Modern Crusaders" (Cretu) – 3:53
"Shadows in Silence" (Cretu) – 4:19
"Return to Innocence" (Curly M.C., Kuo Ying-nan, Kuo Hsiu-chu) – 4:15
"I Love You ... I'll Kill You" (Curly, David Fairstein) – 8:01
"Principles of Lust" (Curly) – 3:08
"Sadeness (Part I)" (Curly, F. Gregorian, Fairstein) – 4:15
"Silence Must Be Heard" (Cretu, Gad) – 4:46
"Smell of Desire" (Cretu, Fairstein) – 4:32
"Mea Culpa" (Curly, Fairstein) – 4:31
"Push the Limits" (Cretu, Gad) – 3:48
"Beyond the Invisible" (Cretu, Fairstein) – 4:50
"Age of Loneliness" (Curly) – 4:10
"Morphing Thru Time" (Cretu) – 5:26
"The Cross of Changes" (Cretu) – 2:15

Charts

Weekly charts

Year-end charts

Certifications

References

2001 greatest hits albums
Enigma (German band) albums
Virgin Records compilation albums